Gujarati is an Indo-Aryan language native to the Indian state of Gujarat. Much of its phonology is derived from Sanskrit.

Vowels

 Sanskrit's phonemic vowel length has been lost. Vowels are long when nasalized or in a final syllable.
  and  developed in the 15th century. Old Gujarati split into Rajasthani and Middle Gujarati.

Consonants

 A fourth nasal phoneme is postulated for the phones  and the nasalization of a preceding vowel . Before velar and palatal stops, there is variation between these; e.g. ~ ('ask for'), ~ ('swing').
The absence of release entails deaspiration of voiceless stops.
 Intervocalically and with murmuring of vowels, the voiced aspirated stops  have voiced spirant allophones .
The two voiced retroflex plosives /ɖʱ, ɖ/ and the retroflex nasal /ɳ/ have flapped allophones [ɽʱ, ɽ, ɽ̃]. The plosives /ɖʱ, ɖ/ are unflapped initially, geminated, and after nasal vowels; and flapped intervocalically, finally, and before or after other consonants. The nasal /ɳ/ is unflapped before retroflex plosives and intervocalically, and in final position varies freely between flapped and unflapped.
 The distribution of sibilants varies over dialects and registers.
 Some dialects only have , others prefer , while another system has them non-contrasting, with  occurring contiguous to palatal segments. Retroflex  still appears in clusters in which it precedes another retroflex:  ('clear').
 Some speakers maintain  as well for Persian and English borrowings. The same cannot be so easily said for English:  ('cheese').
For educated speakers speaking this register, this replacement does not extend to Sanskrit borrowings.

Phonotactical constraints include:
  and  do not occur word-initially.
 Clusters occur initially, medially, and finally. Geminates occur only medially.
 Triconsonantal initial clusters include  - most of which occur in borrowings.
 Geminates were previously treated as long consonants, but they are better analyzed as clusters of two identical segments. Two proofs for this:
 The u in geminated uccār "pronunciation" sounds more like the one in clustered udgār ('utterance') than the one in shortened ucāṭ ('anxiety').
 Geminates behave towards (that is, disallow) -deletion like clusters do.

Gemination can serve as intensification. In some adjectives and adverbs, a singular consonant before the agreement vowel can be doubled for intensification. #VCũ → #VCCũ.

Stress
The matter of stress is not quite clear:
 Stress is on the first syllable except when it doesn't have  and the second syllable does.
 Stress is barely perceptible.
 Stress typically falls on the penultimate syllable of a word, however, if the penultimate vowel in a word with more than two syllables is schwa, stress falls on the preceding syllable.

ə-deletion
Schwa-deletion, along with a-reduction and -insertion, is a phonological process at work in the combination of morphemes. It is a common feature among Indo-Aryan languages, referring to the deletion of a stem's final syllable's  before a suffix starting with a vowel.

This does not apply for monosyllabic stems and consonant clusters. So, better put, #VCəC + V# → #VCCV#. It also doesn't apply when the addition is an o plural marker (see Gujarati grammar#Nouns) or e as an ergative case marker (see Gujarati grammar#Postpositions). It sometimes doesn't apply for e as a locative marker.

ɑ-reduction
This can be seen in the derivation of nouns from adjective stems, and in the formation of passive and causative forms of verb stems.

-insertion
This can be seen in the formation of passive and causative forms of verb stems.

The second example shows an ɑ-reduction as well.

ə-insertion
ə finds itself inserted between the emphatic particle  and consonant-terminating words it postpositions.

Murmur
 serves as a source for murmur, of which there are three rules:

The former follows the regular pattern of the stable root  serving as a point for characteristic suffixations. The latter, on the other hand, is deviant and irregular in this respect.

The  situation can be explained through murmur.

Thus below are the declensions of  -possessing, murmur-eliciting root , this time with the application of the murmur rules on the root shown, also to which a preceding rule must be taken into account:

 0. A final root vowel gets deleted before a suffix starting with a non-consonant.

One other predictable source for murmur is voiced aspirated stops. A clear vowel followed by a voiced aspirated stop can vary with a pair gaining murmur and losing aspiration: .

References

Bibliography

 
 
 
 
 
 
 
 
 
 
 

Gujarati language
Indo-Aryan phonologies